Idiacanthus atlanticus, the black dragonfish, is a barbeled dragonfish of the family Stomiidae, found circumglobally in southern subtropical and temperate oceans between latitudes 25°S and 60°S, at depths down to . The species is sexually dimorphic: females are black with six stripes; males are brown, and lack the females' canine teeth, pelvic fins and barbel.

Black dragonfish are bioluminescent, but unlike most such predators, which use their light primarily to attract prey, they can see their own light. As a result, the fish can use their light to hunt. The light is nearly in the infrared and barely visible to the human eye.

In the larval stage, the eyes of the larvae appear as long stalks that dangle out of the body. Eventually, they retreat as the fish ages and reaches maturity.

References

Stomiidae
Taxa named by August Brauer
Fish described in 1906